Kwagh-hir (literally means something magical or a thing of magic and pronounced kwaa-hee) is a multipart culturally edifying art form of the Tiv people of central Nigeria which became popular in the 1960s. It is a dramatic public performance telling moral stories of past and current events, and incorporates puppetry, masquerading, poetry, music, dance and animated narratives to portray its moral themes. It is used by the Tiv people to reinforce traditional beliefs and convey other worldly tales to educate, socialize, provide secular entertainment and address societal issues.

The most familiar variant of the  according to Jonathan Fogel may be the Punch and Judy show, in which recognizable characters lampoons current political figures and events in the news while also referencing an array of cultural mores.

 was inscribed on the Representative List of the Intangible Cultural Heritage of Humanity in 2019 by the decision of the Intergovernmental Committee: 14.COM 10.B.27

Origin and development

Legend has it that Adikpo Songo from Akpagher; Mbatyav in the present day Gboko local government area of Benue State, Nigeria, was the originator of Kwagh-hir. Adikpo Songu, in an interview with Iyorwuese Hagher, a scholar of Kwagh-hir, attempted to corroborate this view held by several  group leaders and notable elders in Tivland.

Songu, an ardent supporter of the United Middle Belt Congress (UMBC) revealed that in December 1960 during the outbreak of the political crisis in Tivland known as Nande-Nande (the burning cycle) whereby members of the UMBC rose against the ruling Northern People's Congress (NPC), burning their properties, including that of government workers and chiefs, he had escaped to Mkar Christian Hospital, near Gboko, for medical treatment, but deductively, to escape arrest from the police.

On his way back from Mkar Christian Hospital, having traveled for about 12 miles, he arrived near the Orkoor River when suddenly he heard the sound of fascinating music. As he drew closer, hiding behind bamboo reeds and watching, he saw a crowd of two groups. Their positions coincided with the direction of two clans, Mbayion and Mbatyav. He then realized that the performers were not really human beings but  (spirits).

In this instance, instead of a storyteller, a man would come to the centre of the arena and at the top of his voice announce to the audience what they were about to see.

Adikpo Songu says he fell asleep watching the spectacle, and upon waking up the following morning, there was nothing in the vicinity to show that an event of such had taken place in the location. So he came to the conclusion that the  must have deliberately selected him for the purpose of entrusting him with the responsibility of bringing  to the Tiv people, and humanity in the form and style he had been privileged to watch.

According to Iyorwuese Hagher, the Tiv are not want to the personalization of artworks. Thus, his inquisition into the originator of the  may have been lost on the Tiv people. Hence they offered the leading  artist as the originator.

However, Gowon Ama Doki avers that contemporary  puppet theatre owes its birth to Adikpo Songu from Mbatyav clan in Gboko area of Benue State when he held an audience spellbound with his puppets and masquerades in 1960.

Nevertheless, the nexus of  scholars, including Doki, is that like any other theatrical performance,  cannot be linked to a single individual as an originator. Rather, it is a creation of the mass populace of a people, coming together to share experiences.

The Nyambuan theatre

Before , the Tiv had seen another theatrical performance known as Nyambuan which was prominent between 1934 and 1939. Nyambuan literally means the meat is gone bad. It was a slogan and movement targeted at demystifying the Mbatsav (evil people). The performance took the form of a celebration, with music players and dancers forming the major aspect of the performance which was based on rituals. There were massive arrests and unlawful detentions of the Nyambuan performers.

The Kwagh-hir, which later emerged and is practised today, de-emphasises dialogue because of the brutality with which the Nyambuan cult dramatists were suppressed by the combined efforts of the missionaries and the British colonial government.

Structural organization
A  group or event is multifaceted in its structural organization. It involves the collective efforts of members who all have distinct roles to play. A typical  group, according to Iyorwuese Hagher, is segmented into four: the management; the performers; the musicians and the sculptors (carvers).

Management
Several roles have been identified in a typical  group involving men, women and youth.

Ter kwagh-hir (patron) - Gives identity to group and ensures intra group harmony.
Orkyon (chairman of  group management committee) - Usually an affluent member of the community who provides resources for the welfare of the group
Ordondon (chairman of  group management committee) - Assists  in the welfare of the group.
Orngeren (secretary) - Summons meetings and presents agenda. Also issues communiqués from the management to the membership
Ikpanyar (treasurer) - Responsible for all monies accruing to the group and disburses same accordingly.
Tor Kwagh-hir (artistic director) - Chairperson of the management team. He coordinates the entire ensemble and is also in charge of their welfare.
Torkwase (women's leader) - Looks after female artists’ welfare and needs during performances. Also in charge of choreography of all women dances and teaches them songs as well.
Dugeri (warder) - Ensures discipline and settles minor disputes between members.
Tor Ikyo (forest guard) - Leads and guides wood carvers in the forest.
Agum-a-ior (youths) - Ensures the safety of visitors, guard the elements and inspire performers during productions.

Performers

There are several performers in a  group and their roles are determined by the story they intend to portray. However, the list below shows the performers found in virtually every  group that exists.

  (narrator) - Most articulate member who is responsible for rapport between the audience and the performers. He cues in the performers and fills-in breaks with witty performances.
  (masqueraders) - Those behind the masks and theatrical garments.
  (lighting man) - In charge of lights.
  (puppeteers) - Controllers of marionettes from beneath the platform.
  (horn blower or timekeeper) - Times the duration of the various performances

Musicians

Sculptor
Sculptor is rarely seen during the  performance. However, he is the mainstay of a  group. In practice, he is regarded as the scriptwriter and director because he determines the rendition and aesthetics of performances. The sculptor, based on his inventiveness is hired to produce puppets and mask for a group.

Theatre arena
 stage is divided into the main area, chorus position, backstage and auditorium.

The main area is a semi-circular formation in the performing area. This is where artists perform their best skill after moving round the fringes. The chorus position is at a corner of the stage. It joins the audience with the backstage and is occupied by singers and dancers.

The backstage is usually the backyard of round huts. This area is strictly restricted to the  group members. The auditorium is the area surrounding the main arena around where the audience sits.

Kwagh-hir aesthetics and cosmetics

 aesthetics are drawn from the patterns of the Tiv culture and depicts the Tiv understanding of their life. This is projected by the use of varied design concepts that are sewn into various styles so as to connote societal activities. The masks are elaborate and reflect the versatile aesthetic background of the Tiv people.

The sundry accoutrements of  all have a moral standpoints. The puppets are naturalistic, grotesque and even ridiculous, yet all reflecting the moral prejudices and sanctions of the Tiv society. Historical awareness is shown in some puppets which represents events such as when the first woman emerged or when modern dress styles of European design gained local acceptance.

The  puppets possess aesthetic characteristics such as triangular noses, Nok-like eyes, small lips and triangular nostrils. The colours used in painting the puppets are vibrant, because the  artists use colours straight from the source. There is no deliberate attempt at creating tones, shades or tints. Costumes for the masquerade are elaborately made and are also highly coloured.

Each of the masks and masquerade objects are crafted to depict symbolic action and movement that explains aspects of the Tiv worldview. Each mask nuances expresses, and interprets reality among human, animal, spirit, and environment. Each conveys deep emotions of fear, laughter, anger, love and even indifference. Each kwagh-hir character is associated with its appearance and creates a non-visual layer of recognition for audience members.

Notable kwagh-hir artistic directors
The following are some of the notable Ator-a-Kwagh-hir (artistic directors):
Adikpo Songo
Anande Chieshe
Adasu Jirgba
Ayange Gwer
Kende Kaase
Apev Akaa
Chia Gbagir

Notes 

A. This narration is a paraphrase of the interview Iyorwuese Hagher had with Adikpo Songu on 4 January 1978.
B. This section is a sample of how some  groups are organized, according to Iyorwuese Hagher.

References

External links
 "Kwagh-Hir theatrical performance on UNESCO website"
 "UNESCO video on Kwagh-Hir theatrical performance on Youtube
 "Lost Cultures: Reviving The Kwagh Hir Theater on Youtube by Terver Malu"
 "Tiv Kwagh-hir puppetry" on Youtube by Rita Iorbo

Intangible Cultural Heritage of Humanity
Masterpieces of the Oral and Intangible Heritage of Humanity
Nigerian art
Masquerade ceremonies in Africa
Theatre
Performing arts
Puppetry
Dance in Africa
African dances
African art